John Campbell  Baird (27 July 1856 – 4 March 1902) was a Scottish footballer, who played for Vale of Leven and Scotland.

References

Sources

External links
 
 London Hearts profile

1856 births
1902 deaths
Scottish footballers
Scotland international footballers
Vale of Leven F.C. players
People from Alexandria, West Dunbartonshire
Footballers from West Dunbartonshire
Association football forwards